Northern Pictures is an Australian-based television production company, which develops and produces  unscripted and factual television programs for multiple television channels in Australia and internationally. The company was founded by Sue Clothier in 2010.

In 2013, Clothier sold the company to David Haslingden, a media executive who also acquired New Zealand company NHNZ around the same time, through his Racat Group. In the same year, the company formed a joint venture with Keshet International to operate Keshet Australia.

In 2017, Haslingden sold his production company holdings (including Northern Pictures) to Canadian company Blue Ant Media.

In 2018, the Australian Geographic publication was sold to Northern Pictures.

Northern Pictures employs a number of staff including Peter Anderson (Managing Director), Karina Holden (Head of Factual), Catherine Nebauer (Head of Kids & Scripted) & Tosca Looby (Factual Series Producer/Director).

Productions
Changing Minds (ABC, 2014–2015)
Employable Me (ABC, 2018)
Ice Wars (ABC, 2016)
Kakadu (ABC, 2013)
Life on the Reef (ABC/PBS, 2015)
Love on the Spectrum (Netflix, 2019–2020)
Luke Warm Sex (ABC, 2016)
Once Upon a Time in Punchbowl (SBS, 2014)
Once Upon a Time in Carlton (SBS)
Once Upon a Time in Cabramatta (SBS, 2012)
Outback (PBS/Nine, 2017)
Saltwater Heroes (Discovery Channel, 2015)

References

External links

Blue Ant Media
Television production companies of Australia
Australian companies established in 2010
Companies based in Sydney
Australian subsidiaries of foreign companies
Mass media companies established in 2010